The Anglican Church of St Michael in Stoke St Michael, Somerset, England was built around 1400. It is a Grade II* listed building.

History

The western tower survives from the building constructed around 1400. The remainder was largely being rebuilt as part of a Victorian restoration in 1838 by Jesse Gane.

The church was a chapelry of Doulting.

The parish is part of the Leigh-on-Mendip with Downhead and Stoke St Michael benefice within the Diocese of Bath and Wells.

Architecture

The stone building has a five-bay nave and a chancel.

The tower is supported by diagonal buttresses.

See also  
 List of ecclesiastical parishes in the Diocese of Bath and Wells

References

Grade II* listed buildings in Mendip District
Grade II* listed churches in Somerset
15th-century church buildings in England